Vinhere railway station is a station on Konkan Railway. The preceding station on the line is Karanjadi railway station and the next station is Diwankhavati railway station.

References

Railway stations along Konkan Railway line
Railway stations in Raigad district
Ratnagiri railway division